Deh Nesa-ye Olya (also Romanized as Deh Nesā-ye ‘Olyā; also known as Deh Nesā-ye Bālā) is a village in Vardasht Rural District, in the Central District of Semirom County, Isfahan Province, Iran. At the 2006 census, its population was 374, in 94 families.

References 

Populated places in Semirom County